John Murtha (August 9, 1951) is a Wisconsin politician and former member of the Wisconsin State Assembly.

Biography

Born in Baldwin, Wisconsin, Murtha attended St. Croix Central (Hammond) High School and Chippewa Valley Technical College in wood technology. He is a Republican. He was Chairman of the Town Board of Eau Galle, Wisconsin from 2003 through 2009.  He served in the Wisconsin State Assembly from 2007 through 2017. He is a member of the National Rifle Association and the Aircraft Owners and Pilots Association.

Electoral history

| colspan="6" style="text-align:center;background-color: #e9e9e9;"| Primary Election

| colspan="6" style="text-align:center;background-color: #e9e9e9;"| General Election

| colspan="6" style="text-align:center;background-color: #e9e9e9;"| Primary Election

| colspan="6" style="text-align:center;background-color: #e9e9e9;"| General Election

| colspan="6" style="text-align:center;background-color: #e9e9e9;"| Primary Election

| colspan="6" style="text-align:center;background-color: #e9e9e9;"| General Election

| colspan="6" style="text-align:center;background-color: #e9e9e9;"| Primary Election

| colspan="6" style="text-align:center;background-color: #e9e9e9;"| General Election

| colspan="6" style="text-align:center;background-color: #e9e9e9;"| Primary Election

| colspan="6" style="text-align:center;background-color: #e9e9e9;"| General Election

References

People from Baldwin, Wisconsin
County supervisors in Wisconsin
Mayors of places in Wisconsin
1951 births
Living people
21st-century American politicians
Republican Party members of the Wisconsin State Assembly